Missouri Route 242, also known as Horseshoe Bend Parkway, is a short highway in central Missouri found within Lake Ozark. The highway runs from the US 54 expressway junction near Osage Beach in Miller County in the east to Route MM (near the Community Toll Bridge) in Camden County.

History 
Plans to build Route 242 existed since 2007. Construction for the project did not start at the time due to lack of funding. The project broke ground on January 18, 2011. Route 242 opened on December 13, 2011.

Route description 
The west end of Missouri Route 242 begins at the intersection of Horseshoe Bend Pkwy and Route MM, a road which leads to the Lake of the Ozarks Community Bridge and subsequent toll plaza. Continuing east, the road intersects with Fish Haven Road before reaching the intersection of Bagnell Dam Boulevard. The road continues for about a half-mile (800 m) more, where it allows access to both directions of US 54 through an interchange.

Major intersections

References 

242
Transportation in Camden County, Missouri
Transportation in Miller County, Missouri